This is a timeline of the presence of Eastern Orthodoxy in Greece. The history of Greece traditionally encompasses the study of the Greek people, the areas they ruled historically, as well as the territory now composing the modern state of Greece.

Ottoman rule (1453–1821) 

"The fifteenth-century Ottoman Empire reunited the Roman Orthodox as subjects of their patriarch in Constantinople. Yet it was not the Byzantine Empire in disguise. Even though Mehmed the Conqueror resettled Constantinople as the centre of the Roman Orthodox world, he was even more effective in making it the capital of an Islamic empire." The privileges given to the Greek Church by Mehmed, in 1453, were able to save only a part of Byzantine Christendom from Islamization and Turkification, and most of those who remained Christians (and Greeks) accepted the unenviable fate of the rayas. Pressure to convert and the insecurity of Christian life produced widespread Crypto-Christianity in various regions, and there were also forced conversions and neo-martyrs. In practice, Greeks were forbidden to build or furnish churches, to carry arms or to dress like Moslems. However following the example of Byzantine emperors, the Sultans hastened to ratify the ownership of land by the Church and by monasteries and renewed their privileges. British historian Sir Steven Runciman has written also that although it was Orthodoxy that preserved Hellenism throughout the dark centuries, without the moral force of Hellenism Orthodoxy itself might have withered.

 1454 Dismantling of a planned rebellion against Venetian rule in Crete. This became known as the conspiracy of Sifis Vlastos and was an opposition to the religious reforms for the unification of Churches agreed at the Council of Florence.
 1454 Accession of Gennadius Scholarius as Ecumenical Patriarch of Constantinople (1454–56 and 1464–65), confirmed by Mehmed the Conqueror, who invested him with the signs of his office – the crosier (dikanikion) and mantle, and confirmed the Patriarch's ancient privileges; in following the Islamic doctrine which enjoined tolerance towards Christians and Jews as "People of the Book," the religious Head of the Greek Church became also Ethnarch (Greek: ἐθνάρχης), thus establishing the Rūm millet (millet-i Rûm), or "Roman nation," the name of the Orthodox Christian community within the Ottoman Empire; the Great School of the Nation is established in Constantinople under the direction of Greek Renaissance scholar Mathaeos Kamariotis, as a continuation of the University of Constantinople after the Fall of Constantinople.
 1456–1458 Fall of Athens to the Ottoman Turks under Turahanoğlu Ömer Bey.
 1456–1587 Byzantine Church of Theotokos Pammakaristos became the seat of the Ecumenical Patriarchate.
 1460 Parthenon Cathedral dedicated to the Mother of God, is turned into a mosque on the sultan's order.
 1461 In July, the Byzantine general Graitzas Palaiologos honourably surrendered Salmeniko Castle, the last garrison of the Despotate of the Morea, to the invading forces of the Ottoman Empire after a year-long siege; on 15 August, the Empire of Trebizond, the last major Romano-Greek outpost, fell to the Ottoman Empire under Mehmed II, after a 21-day siege, bringing to a final end the Byzantine–Ottoman Wars.
 1462 Death of Matrona of Chios.
 1463 Demolition of the Byzantine Church of the Holy Apostles (which had served as a site of Byzantine imperial ceremony), then under Venetian rule, to make way for construction of the Fatih Mosque; Greek scholar and pro-unionist Basilios Bessarion, formerly an Orthodox Metropolitan, later becoming a Roman Catholic Cardinal, is given the purely ceremonial title of Latin Patriarch of Constantinople by Pope Pius II.
 1472 Decrees of the Council of Ferrara-Florence are repudiated by a Council of Contantinople; marriage of Ivan III of Russia to Princess Zoe-Sophia Palaiologina, a niece of Constantine XI, the last Byzantine emperor, leading to the doctrine of Moscow as the Third Rome.
 1480 Patriarch Maximus III wrote to the Doge of Venice asking for an end to the persecution of Orthodox clergy and for permission to collect a special levy for the patriarch.
1489–1571 Church of Cyprus is subordinated to the Venetian rule, which ends with the siege and capture of Nicosia and Famagusta by the Ottomans.
 1494 The Aldine Press is set up in Venice by the Italian humanist, printer and publisher Aldo Manuzio, becoming the greatest international force in spreading the Venetian study of Greek, including the great masterpieces of Antiquity, as well as the works of later Greek writers, theological, educational, ethical and secular.
 1498 The Typikon of Manuel II Palaeologus of 1394 is issued on Mt. Athos.
 16th–17th centuries.  Pax Ottomanica , or Ottoman Peace, characterized by the prosperity of the early Ottoman centuries, especially during the reign of Suleiman the Magnificent (1520–1566), and by the relative religious tolerance of this multi-religious and multi-ethnic empire, in an age when most European monarchs by contrast tried to impose religious homogeneity upon their subjects (i.e. Protestant Reformation and Roman Catholic Counter-Reformation in the West).
 1511 Death of Joseph the Sanctified of Crete.
 1517 Recognition of the Patriarchate of Alexandria by Selim I, on the Sultan's conquest of Egypt.
 1518 Church of Saints Peter and Paul of the Greeks in Naples, Italy is founded to serve the needs of Greek Orthodox faithful who became refugees after the Fall of Constantinople.

 c. 1520 Sultan Selim I, who disliked Christianity, suggested to his vizier that all Christians should be forcibly converted to Islam.
 1522 The first printed copy of the Septuagint (earliest extant Greek translation of the Old Testament from the original Hebrew) was issued in the Complutensian Polyglot Bible (1514–22).
 1526 New Martyr John of Ioannina.
 1530 Mother of God restores sight to blind youth through the Cassiope icon of Corfu.
 1537 Sultan Suleiman the Magnificent implemented a tolerant and judicious religious policy over his multinational empire, and granted to Christians  'the great privilege of ours, to practise our religion freely and without any impediment.' 
 1541 Patr. Jeremiah I founds Stavronikita monastery.
 1554 New Martyr Nicholas of Psari in Corinth.
 1556 Death of Maximos the Greek, Greek monk, publicist, writer, scholar, humanist, and translator active in Russia.

 1556–65 The Patriarchal School of Joasaph II is initially established in Constantinople as a Greek school under the direction of Ioannes Zygomalas, being the forerunner of the later Great School of the Nation.
 1559 Death of Icon painter Theophanes the Cretan (Theophanes Strelitzas).
 1561 Compilation of the Nomocanon of Manuel Malaxos, a notary of the Metropolitan Diocese of Thebes, having a wide circulation, with a version in classical Greek and another in modern Greek.

 1565 The inhabitants of Epirus and Albania rose and slaughtered the officers charged with carrying out the child levy, but the Sultan sent to the local Sanjak-bey a reinforcement of 500 Janissaries and the revolt was put down.
 1569 All the landed property of the monasteries in the Ottoman Empire are confiscated by Sultan Selim II.
 1571–1878 Restoration of Church of Cyprus to Orthodox rule, under the Ottomans.

 c. 1571–80 The city of Athens contained 17,616 inhabitants, up from 12,633 in the years 1520–30.
 1573 The Church of San Giorgio dei Greci is completed by the Greek community of Venice, historically the most important church of the Greek Orthodox Diaspora, becoming the ethnic and religious center of Hellenism in the city and broader region of Venice which at its peak numbered 15,000 members.
 1574–82 Michael Damaskinos, the greatest Cretan icon painter of the day, paints the iconostasis of the Church of San Giorgio dei Greci in Venice.
 1575 The Patriarchate of Constantinople granted Mount Sinai autonomous status.
 1576–1581 Correspondence between Patr. Jeremias II and the Lutheran professors at Tübingen.
 1576 Pope Gregory XIII establishes Pontifical Greek College of St. Athanasius (popularly known as the 'Greek College') in Rome, which he charged with educating Italo-Byzantine clerics.
 1577 Metr. Gabriel (Severus) of Philadelphia was appointed to the new Orthodox Archbishopric (1578) centered in Venice at the Church of San Giorgio dei Greci, remaining as shepherd there for forty years (1577–1616).
 1579 Death of Gerasimos of Cephalonia, the new ascetic.
 1580 It was believed that on Great and Holy Saturday, the Holy Fire miraculously shot out of one of three stone columns at the entrance of the Church of the Holy Sepulchre in Jerusalem, splitting and charring the column, and lighting the candles held by the Greek Orthodox Patriarch of Jerusalem Sophronius IV who was standing nearby, having not descended for the heterodox Armenian Patriarch who had attempted to obtain it inside the church; there were 15,000 Greeks living in Venice.

 1583  Sigillion of 1583  issued against Gregorian Calendar by council convened in Constantinople; arrival of the first Jesuits in Constantinople.
 1587 The Greek Orthodox Patriarchal Church (Patrik Kilisesi) in Constantinople – the Church of Theotokos Pammakaristos, was seized by the Ottoman authorities and converted into a mosque.
 1589 Patr. Jeremias II of Constantinople raises Metr. Job of Moscow to the rank of Patriarch of Moscow and of All Russia, recognizing the autocephaly and canonical territory of Church of Russia; death of Philothei of Athens.
 c. 1589 Death of Venerable David of Euboea, Wonderworker and founder in 1540 of the Monastery of Venerable Father David, dedicated to the Transfiguration of the Savior.
 1590 Death of Timothy of Oropos, founder of the monastery of the Dormition of the Virgin Mary on the Penteliko Mountain (Athens).
 1591 The Church of the Rotonda in Thessaloniki (Church of Agios Georgios), founded in 306 AD, is converted into an Ottoman mosque.
 1593 The termination of the authority of the Protos, as the supreme administrative and spiritual leader of the Athonite monks, and the establishment of the "Megali Synaxis" (The Great Council) at Kariai, as the supreme authority in charge of all affairs concerning the monastic community of Mount Athos.
 1595 Pope Clement VIII declared in his Constitution  Magnus Dominus  (23 December 1595), which announced the Union of Brest, that Orthodox Chrism was not valid and had to be repeated by a Roman Catholic bishop and that all Orthodox clergy had to accept the union; in Italy, the Greek language was forbidden in the liturgy and the College of St Athanasius (formally established in Rome in 1581) became one of the main centres of anti-Eastern Orthodox propaganda; this Pope also replaced all Orthodox bishops with his own people, a policy that alienated local populations, who yearned for the religious tolerance enjoyed by Ottoman subjects.
 1601 New Hieromartyr Seraphim, Bishop of Phanarion and Neokhorion.
 From 1601. The relatively modest Church of St George in the Phanar district of Istanbul becomes the seat of the Ecumenical Patriarchate.
 1602 Death of Seraphim of Lebadeia.
 1622 The Patriarchal School (Great School of the Nation) was entrusted to the Athenian Neo-Aristotelian scholar and gifted teacher Theophilos Korydalleus, who directed it with absences until 1640, becoming the leader of the philosophical school which was to predominate for the next two hundred years.

 1624 Death of Dionysius of Zakynthos.

 1625  Confession of Faith by Metrophanes Kritopoulos written, while he was a student at the University of Helmstedt in Germany.
 1627 Hieromonk Nicodemos Metaxas (1585–1646) founded the first Greek printing press in Constantinople, becoming involved in printing refutations of Roman Catholic theology, since the Roman Catholic campaign for the conversion of the Greeks was then at a great activity.
 1629 Confession of Cyril Lucaris is published under his name in Geneva (Lucarian Confession), being Calvinistic in doctrine, composed by Calvinist theologians who submitted their draft to the Patriarch for his signature in order to promulgate their novel doctrines.
 1638 First translation into Modern Greek of the New Testament, by the Greek hieromonk Maximos Rodios of Gallipoli (Kallioupolitis); martyrdom of Patr. Cyril Loukaris, one of the most important personalities of the Turkish period, though controversial, martyred by the Ottoman Turks at the instigation of the Roman Catholic Church via the religious and political influence of the Jesuits and Capuchins of Constantinople, and the French and Austrian ambassadors.

 1647 Conversion to Islam of the Metropolitan of Rhodes Meletios, who under the name of Aslan occupied a high post in the Ottoman Court hierarchy, but was executed by the Ottomans in 1661.
 1650–1700 Ottoman Constantinople is largest city in the world by population.

 1651 Death of Nilus the Myrrh-gusher of Mt. Athos.
 1657 New Hieromartyr Parthenius III, Patriarch of Constantinople.
 1662 The Patriarchal School (Great School of the Nation) acquired permanent income, a building and remarkable teachers, among them Alexandros Mavrokordatos who bore the title Confidant.
 1669 Greek island of Crete taken by Ottoman Empire from Venetians; martyrdom of John Naukliros ("the Navigator", "the Skipper"), burned alive on Kos.

 1672 Synod of Jerusalem convened by Greek Orthodox Patriarch of Jerusalem Dositheos Notaras, refuting article by article the Calvinistic confession attributed to Hieromartyr Cyril Lucaris, defining Orthodoxy relative to Roman Catholicism and Protestantism, and defining the Orthodox Biblical canon; the acts of this council are later signed by all five patriarchates (including Russia).
 1673 Death of Panagiotis Nikousios, the first Greek Grand Dragoman, exercising great influence on the foreign policy of the Ottoman Empire, and being a great benefactor to the Greek nation and Church, including establishing the rights enjoyed by the Greeks over the Church of the Holy Sepulchre.
 1675 Large scale emigrations of Maniotes to Corsica, first to Paomia, and later to Cargèse, the Greek inhabitants of which speak a special dialect; in an urgent firman issued in late 1675 the Ottoman government made it unequivocally clear that the Church of the Nativity in Bethlehem was an exclusively Christian shrine, and that true Muslims were to keep away from there, either for pilgrimage or for the purpose of disruption; death of Metr. Joseph (Nelyubovich-Tukalsky) of Kiev and all Rus', Exarch of Ukraine and the last Ukrainian metropolitan to recognize the authority of the Ecumenical Patriarchate of Constantinople (thenceforth the see was administered by Moscow with the election in 1685 of Gedeon (Svyatopolk-Chetvertynsky) as the first Metropolitan of Kiev of the Russian Orthodox Church).
 1676 Abp. Joseph (Georgirenes) of Samos journeyed to London, England, becoming involved in efforts to erect a Greek church there.
 1677 After appeals by the members of the Greek Community of London to the Privy Council for permission to erect a Greek church, Bp. Henry Compton assigned a site for building the church, which was ready for use by the end of 1677.
 1680 Female mass suicide of 30-40 young girls from the village of Hazar in the region of Pafra in Western Pontus, who preferred to fall from a fortress (known as the 'fortress of Ali') into a 150-meter precipice, rather than to fall into the hands of the Turkish forces of Hassan Ali Bey, who were on a campaign to capture young girls in order to send them to the slave markets of Anatolia.

 1682 Greek church in Soho (London) is closed and the building is leased to French Huguenots.
 1684 New Hieromartyr Zacharias, Bishop of Corinth.
 1685–87 Two Greek brothers Ioannikios and Sophronios Likhud, monks from Cephalonia, founded and managed the Slavic Greek Latin Academy, organized as the first higher education establishment in Moscow, on the premises of the Zaikonospassky Monastery, with over 70 students.
 1688–1715 Venetian Rule of the Peloponnese peninsula.
 1687 Parthenon devastated by Venetian shelling.
 1691 On the recommendation of Grand Vizier Mustafa Köprül, ordinances were issued which bear the collective name Nizam Djedid (the 'New System'), which called upon provincial Governors to act justly towards Christians and not to increase their burden of taxation.
 1695 New Hieromartyr Romanos of Dominitza (or Diminitsa), Lacedemonia.
 1699–1705 Greek College is established at Gloucester Hall as a separate college for Greek Orthodox students at Oxford University.
 c. 1700 By the eighteenth century there were some forty Greek churches in Constantinople, but only three of these had been built before the conquest, including: St. George of the Cypresses in Psamathia (which was destroyed by earthquake early in the century), St. Demetrius Kanavou (which was destroyed by fire a few years later), and St. Mary of the Mongols (which still remains a church today, though it was badly damaged in the anti-Greek riots of 1955).

 1705 A serious revolt against the officers of the child levy took place at Naoussa, when the inhabitants led by an armatolos named Zisis Karademos refused to give up their children and killed the Government officers, however their punishment was harsh, as the rebels were killed or strangled and part of the population was imprisoned.
 1707 Death of Athanasius the New, Wonderworker of Christianopolis.
 1711 Death of Bp. Sophianos of Dryinoupolis, Orthodox missionary in Ottoman Epirus.
 1713 Theological School of Patmos founded by St. Makarios Kalogeras.
 1714 Death of Ilias Miniatis, Bishop of Kalavryta (since 1710), and an outstanding orator and eloquent preacher of the Greek Church, whose preachings are considered exemplars for modern ecclesiastical rhetoric and one of the earliest formative influences on cultivated modern Greek.
 1716 Reported Miracle of St. Spyridon, who saves Corfu from Ottoman invasion.
 1720 Monastery of the Life-Giving Spring (Poros) founded.
 1722 Council in Constantinople, in which Athanasios of Antioch (died 1724) and Chrysanthos of Jerusalem (1707–1731) participated, decided for the re-baptism of the Latins.

 1728 The Ecumenical Patriarchate formally replaced the Creation Era (AM) calendar, in use for over 1000 years, with the Christian Era (AD).

 1730 Death of John the Russian.
 1733 Evangelical School of Smyrna founded.
 1740 Miracle said to have been performed by John the Baptist on the island of Chios; martyrdom of Theocharis of Neapolis, Cappadocia, for refusing to convert to Islam.
 1741 Synodal reform initiated, when Metr. Gerasimos of Heraclia obtains a Firman (decree) from Ottoman officials, regulating and subordinating the election of the Patriarch of Constantinople to the five Metropolitans of Heraclia (Heraclea Perinthus), Cyzicus (Kyzikos), Nicomedia, Nicaea, and Chalcedon, creating the so-called "System of the Elders" (Gerontismos, Γεροντισμος), established gradually and in place until the second half of the 19th century.
 1743 New Hieromartyr Anastasios of Ioannina.

 1744 The first masonic lodge opened in Galata in Constantinople in 1744.
 1749 Athonite Ecclesiastical Academy ("Athonite School") is founded on Mount Athos by the brethren of the Monastery of Vatopedion.
 1751 The monk Theoklitos Poliklidis published a pamphlet (Agathángelos) foretelling the liberation of Christians by a fair-haired people who, at the time, were generally identified as the Russians; New Virgin Martyr Kyranna of Thessalonica.
 1752 Death of philosopher, theologian and lawyer Vikentios Damodos (1700–1752), the first Orthodox to write a theological Dogmatics.
 1753–59 Eminent theologian and scholar Eugenios Voulgaris heads the Athonite School, envisaging a revival and upgrading of learning within the Orthodox Church through substantial training in the classics combined with an exposure to modern European philosophy, including Locke, Leibniz and Wolff.
 1754 Hesychast Renaissance begins with the Kollyvades Movement, whose leaders included St. Makarios of Corinth, Christophoros of Arta, Agapios of Cyprus, Athanasios of Paros, Neophytos Kausokalyvites, and St. Nicodemus the Hagiorite; discovery of the holy relics of the "Four Martyrs of Megara": Polyeuctos, George, Adrianos and Platon, the "Newly-Revealed".
 1755–56 Council of Constantinople, convened and presided over by Ec. Patr. Cyril V, and attended by Patriarchs Matthew (Psaltis) of Alexandria and Parthenius of Jerusalem, and several bishops representing the Orthodox patriarchates,, decrees that Western converts must be baptized upon their reception into the Orthodox Church; this council also condemns and anathematizes anyone that dares to change the calendar (Sigillion of 1756 issued against the Gregorian Calendar by Patr. Cyril V of Constantinople).
 1759 Conservative circles of Mount Athos came out openly against the progressive educational methods of Eugenios Voulgaris, who resigned from the directorship of the Athonite Academy in 1759, and was replaced by Nikolaos Zerzoulis, one of the first proponents of Newtonian science in Greek education.
 1760 On Pascha, 1760, the inhabitants of 36 villages in the Karamouratades district of Northern Epirus (east of Premeti) apostasized to Islam.
 1768 Community of Orthodox Greeks establishes itself in New Smyrna, Florida.

 1770 Greek Rebellion of 1770 (Orlov Events), associated with the Turko-Russian war (1768–74), and considered a prelude to the Greek War of Independence in 1821, saw a failed Greek uprising in the Peloponnese at the instigation of Count Alexei Grigoryevich Orlov; Cretan insurrection against the Ottomans led by Ioannis Daskalogiannis of the Sfakia region is subjugated;
 1778 On the orders of Catherine II, 18,000 Crimean Greeks, tired of living under Ottoman rule, successfully petitioned the empress for permission to move to Russia, and were allowed to settle on the shores of the Sea of Azov, where they founded the city of Mariupol (Marianopolis); death of Petros Peloponnesios, one of the leading representatives of Post-Byzantine musical tradition and the Lampadarios (leader of the left choir) of the Great Church in the 18th century.
 1779 Death of Kosmas Aitolos, Equal to the Apostles.
 1782 First publication of  Philokalia  on Mount Athos, the greatest achievement of the Kollyvades fathers, being an anthology borrowing from thirty-six Church Fathers and ascetics from the 4th to 15th centuries; New Martyr Zacharias of Patra in Morea; the Patriarchate of Constantinople reaffirmed the autonomous status of Mount Sinai.
 1783 The Typikon of the Patriarch Gabriel IV is issued.
 1788–1808 The Patriarchal School of the Patriarchate of Jerusalem thrived under the pre-eminent scholar James of Patmos (Grk.: Ἰάκωβος ὁ Πάτμιος).
 1793 Great New Martyr Polydorus of Cyprus.
 1794 Glorification of Bp. Panaretos of Paphos (†1790) by the Patriarchate of Constantinople; New Martyr Alexander, the former Dervish of Smyrna; Nicodemus of the Holy Mountain first published the  Exomologetarion (a guide for confessors), at the press of Nicholas Glykeus of Ioannina in Venice; the city of Odessa is founded by a decree of the Empress Catherine the Great in compliance with the Greek Plan, having been named Odessos (Oδησσός) after the ancient Greek city in the vicinity, and having a population of 3,150, of whom 2,500 were Greeks.
 1795 New Martyr Theodore of Byzantium, at Mytilene.

 1796 Nicodemus the Hagiorite publishes  Unseen Warfare  in Venice; Nikephoros Theotokis publishes the Kyrīakōdromion, a series of commentaries on the Gospel and Epistle readings of the liturgical calendar, an inspired religious text that was also the first to use the katharevousa form of Modern Greek.
 1797 Hieromartyr George of Neapolis (Nevşehir or Neapolis of Cappadocia).
 1798 Patriarch Anthimios of Jerusalem stated in the  Paternal Teaching (Dhidhaskalia Patriki) that the Ottoman Empire was part of the Divine Dispensation granted by God to protect Orthodoxy from the taint of Roman Catholicism and of Western secularism and irreligion.

 1800 The Rudder  (Greek: Πηδάλιον) published and printed in Athens; death of Hieromonk Nikephoros Theotokis, "Teacher of the Nation".

 1802 New Martyr Luke of Mytilene.
 1803 Female mass suicide at Zalongo (see also 1680 – female mass suicide in the region of Pafra, Western Pontus).
 1805 Death of Makarios of Corinth, a central figure in the Kollyvades Movement.
 1806 Combined persecution of the Klephts of the Morea (Peloponnese), by 1) the Ecumenical Patriarch Kallinikos V who excommunicated them in January, and 2) the Ottoman Sultan Selim III who issued a decree ordering the local population not to provide them shelter or food, to sever all links with them, and report them to the Turkish authorities.
 1808 Smyrna Philological Gymnasium founded by Konstantinos Koumas (1777–1836), one of the most distinguished men of the Greek Enlightenment; New Hieromartyr Nicetas of Serres.
 1809 Death of Nicodemus of the Holy Mountain the "Hagiorite"; death of Hieromartyr Nicetas the Hagiorite.
 1813 Death of Athanasius Parios, the second leader of the Kollyvades Movement, succeeding Neophytos Kausokalyvites (1713–1784).
 1814 Martyrdom of Euthymius and Ignatius of Mount Athos.
 1816 Martyrdom of Acacius of Athos.
 1819 Council at Constantinople endorses views of Kollyvades fathers.

See also

 Social structure of the Ottoman Empire
 List of archbishops of Athens
 Greek Orthodox Church
 Eastern Orthodox Church organization
History
 History of the Eastern Orthodox Church
 History of Eastern Christianity
 History of the Eastern Orthodox Church under the Ottoman Empire
 History of Eastern Orthodox Churches in the 20th century
 Timeline of Eastern Orthodoxy in America
Church Fathers
 Apostolic Fathers
 Church Fathers
 Ante-Nicene Fathers (book)
 Desert Fathers
 Nicene and Post-Nicene Fathers
 List of Church Fathers

Notes

References

Bibliography
 Apostolos E. Vacalopoulos. The Greek Nation, 1453–1669: The Cultural and Economic Background of Modern Greek Society. Transl. from Greek. Rutgers University Press, 1975.
(One of the few scholarly studies in English of this period)
 Christos Yannaras. Orthodoxy and the West: Hellenic Self-Identity in the Modern Age. Transl. Peter Chamberas and Norman Russell. Brookline: Holy Cross Orthodox Press, 2006. 
 Christopher Livanos. Greek Tradition and Latin Influence in the Work of George Scholarios: Alone Against All of Europe. Gorgias Press LLC, 2006. 152 pp. 
 Fr. Nomikos Michael Vaporis. Witnesses for Christ: Orthodox Christian Neomartyrs of the Ottoman Period 1437–1860. St Vladimir's Seminary Press, 2000. 377pp.
 F. W. Hasluck.  Christianity and Islam Under the Sultans, Vol. I. Oxford: Clarendon Press, 1929. 877 pp.
 F. W. Hasluck.  Christianity and Islam Under the Sultans, Vol. II. Oxford: Clarendon Press, 1929. 877 pp.
 George P. Henderson. The Revival of Greek Thought, 1620–1830. State University of New York Press, 1970.
(Focuses on the intellectual revival preceding the War of Independence in 1821)
 George A. Maloney, (S.J.). A History of Orthodox Theology Since 1453. Norland Publishing, Massachusetts, 1976.
 Gerasimos Augustinos (Prof.). The Greeks of Asia Minor: Confession, Community, and Ethnicity in the Nineteenth Century. Kent State University Press, 1992. 270 pp. 
 Ioannis N. Grigoriadis. Instilling Religion in Greek and Turkish Nationalism: A "Sacred Synthesis". Palgrave Pivot. Springer, 2012. 249 pp. 
 John Christos Alexander. Brigandage and Public Order in the Morea, 1685–1806. Imago, 1985. 169 pp.
 Leften S. Stavrianos. The Balkans Since 1453. Rinehart & Company, New York, 1958.
  Martin Crusius (1526–1607). Turcograecia. 1584.
 Speros Vryonis, (Jr). "Byzantine Attitudes towards Islam during the Late Middle Ages." Greek Roman and Byzantine Studies 12 (1971).
 Speros Vryonis, (Jr). The Decline of Medieval Hellenism in Asia Minor and the Process of Islamization from the Eleventh through the Fifteenth Century. University of California Press, Berkeley and Los Angeles, 1971. 
(Very comprehensive, masterpiece of scholarship)
 Steven Runciman. The Great Church in Captivity: A Study of the Patriarchate of Constantinople from the Eve of the Turkish Conquest to the Greek War of Independence. Cambridge University Press,1986.
 Theodore H. Papadopoulos. Studies and Documents Relating to the History of the Greek Church and People Under Turkish Domination. 2nd ed. Variorum, Hampshire, Great Britain, 1990. 
(Scholarly, includes source texts in Greek)
 Victor Roudometof. From Rum Millet to Greek Nation: Enlightenment, Secularization, and National Identity in Ottoman Balkan Society, 1453–1821. Journal of Modern Greek Studies, Volume 16, 1998. pp. 11–48.
 
Articles
 Elizabeth A. Zachariadou. The Great Church in captivity 1453–1586. Eastern Christianity. Ed. Michael Angold. Cambridge University Press, 2006. Cambridge Histories Online.
 Elizabeth A. Zachariadou. Mount Athos and the Ottomans c. 1350–1550. Eastern Christianity. Ed. Michael Angold. Cambridge University Press, 2006. Cambridge Histories Online.
 I. K. Hassiotis. From the 'Refledging' to the 'Illumination of the Nation': Aspects of Political Ideology in the Greek Church Under Ottoman Domination. Balkan Studies 1999 40(1): 41–55.
 Socrates D. Petmezas. Christian Communities in Eighteenth and Early Nineteenth Century Ottoman Greece: Their Fiscal Functions. Princeton Papers: Interdisciplinary Journal of Middle Eastern Studies 2005 12: 71–127.

Cultural history of Greece
Greek Orthodoxy
Orthodoxy in Greece
 
Orthodox Church
Ottoman Greece